Julia Ritter (born 13 May 1998) is a German female shot putter who won individual gold medals at the 2015 Youth World Championships and at the 2017 European U20 Championships.

References

External links

1998 births
Living people
German female shot putters
People from Lünen
Sportspeople from Arnsberg (region)
20th-century German women
21st-century German women